Vyacheslav Fomichyov (born 26 April 1965, Saransk, Mordovian Autonomous Soviet Socialist Republic) is a Russian politician and a deputy of the 8th State Duma.

Biography
Vyacheslav Fomichev was born on April 26, 1965 in Saransk.

Education 
He received a military and legal education.

Career 
In 1982—1993, he served in the Russian Army in command positions. After that, he worked as a lawyer in several companies.

From 2001 to 2004, he was the Head of the General Directorate for Production and Circulation of Alcoholic Products of the Moscow Oblast. In 2004-2006 he headed the Committee on Consumer Market of the Moscow Oblast.

In 2006, Fomichyov was appointed the Minister of Consumer Market and Services for Moscow Oblast.

From 2016 to 2021, he was a deputy of the Moscow Oblast Duma of the 6th convocation. Since September 2021, he has been a deputy of the 8th State Duma.

Family 
Vyacheslav Fomichev is married and has two sons and two daughters.

Preservation of cultural heritage 
Vyacheslav Fomichev is actively engaged in the restoration of cultural heritage sites. To date, four museums have already been created in the Moscow Oblast.

Awards  
 Order "For Personal Courage"

References

1965 births
Living people
United Russia politicians
21st-century Russian politicians
Eighth convocation members of the State Duma (Russian Federation)